Emmett Lathrop Brown, Ph.D., commonly referred to as Doc Brown, is a fictional scientist character in the Back to the Future franchise. In the world of the franchise, he is the inventor of the world's first and second time machines, the first (counting in order of his personal chronology) constructed using a 1981 DeLorean sports car, and the second constructed using a steam engine locomotive.

The character is portrayed by Christopher Lloyd in all three films, as well as in the live action sequences of the animated series. He is voiced by Dan Castellaneta in the animated series. The character's appearance and mannerisms are loosely inspired by Leopold Stokowski and Albert Einstein. In 2008, Dr. Emmett Brown was selected by Empire magazine as one of The 100 Greatest Movie Characters of All Time, ranking at #20.

Fictional biography 
He appears to possess great admiration for scientists from previous eras, naming successive pet dogs Copernicus and Einstein, and having portraits of Isaac Newton, Benjamin Franklin, Thomas Edison and Albert Einstein in his laboratory. His favorite author is Jules Verne and his family name was originally "von Braun" prior to World War I.

Emmett's family moved to Hill Valley from Germany in 1908. Although initially wealthy because of his inheritance, he spent his entire family fortune on his time travel project. When the Brown mansion was destroyed by fire in 1962 and the property sold to developers, Doc subsequently resided in the mansion's garage. Once broke, he established a privately owned business to offer 24-hour scientific services, building ingenious devices for his customers.

Emmett's work appears to be highly regarded, enough for him to win an award for his work. However, he is shown as absent-minded at times, and various statements by other characters inhabiting Hill Valley indicate that he is generally regarded as strange, eccentric, or insane due to him conducting dangerous experiments and crafting devices believed impossible to construct in reality. Being very loud and sprightly, he often speaks with wide-eyed expressions and broad gestures ("Great Scott!" being one of his well-known catchphrases) and tends to be overly verbose in his delivery, referring in one case to a school dance as a "rhythmic ceremonial ritual".

Doc and Marty met when the latter was 14, several years prior to the events of the first time travel experiment. Marty, out of curiosity, sneaked into Doc's lab after being warned by his parents to stay away from him. Happy to be revered as 'cool', Doc hired Marty as his part-time lab assistant.

In the original timeline, in contrast with Marty's shy and unassertive father, George McFly, Doc is a supportive and open-minded mentor for Marty. Doc's positive influence in turn allows Marty to mentor George in 1955, which appears to encourage George's later success as a novelist, and help him become a better husband and father. One line in particular, "If you put your mind to it, you can accomplish anything", originates from Doc. Marty repeats it to George in 1955, who repeats it back to Marty in the post time travel 1985.

Doc has been involved with illegal and criminal enterprises (albeit as a means to obtain items for his inventions he could not purchase legally) but he is naive and care-free about the consequences of his actions. He excitedly tells Marty how he cheated Libyan terrorists out of stolen plutonium: "They wanted me to build them a bomb, so I took their plutonium and, in turn, gave them a shoddy bomb casing full of used pinball machine parts!"

Despite being intelligent and logical for the most part, Doc is somewhat naive at times about the unknown possible uses of his time machine, initially actively explores the course of the world's future and tries to alter the past or future of the principal characters to improve their lives. However, events lead him to conclude that time travel is too dangerous for mankind. His conviction initially strengthened when he realizes that he has unwittingly altered history by preventing the death of Clara Clayton in 1885; he concludes that the time machine has "caused nothing but disaster" and asks Marty to destroy it once he returns to his own time. Nonetheless, Doc pursues a romantic relationship with Clara despite the risks of further disrupting the timeline.

After having been left behind in 1885 when Marty departs in the DeLorean for 1985, Doc starts a family with Clara; the couple have two sons, Jules and Verne. He eventually builds another time machine out of a steam locomotive, completed it in September 1893, and the Browns return to 1985 in order to pick up Einstein and meet with Marty again before setting out for another adventure.

Lloyd reprised the role of Doc Brown in the 2015 direct-to-video short film Doc Brown Saves the World, which reveals that he has returned to his time at some point after the events of Back to the Future Part III and erased the future witnessed in Back to the Future Part II as the various inventions of that time led to mass obesity and Griff Tannen triggering a nuclear holocaust.

Other Back to the Future appearances 

 Back to the Future: The Animated Series, a sequel to the film trilogy, features Dan Castellaneta as the voice of Doc Brown, with Christopher Lloyd appearing in live-action segments. 
 Lloyd filmed new material for Back to the Future the Ride, directed by Douglas Trumbull. The ride serves as a sequel to the films, following Doc Brown and his founding of the 'Institute of Future Technology'. He invites tourists to embark on a time-traveling adventure in his newly made eight-passenger DeLorean. The ride was included on the first film's 2009 DVD re-release and on the trilogy's 2010 Blu-ray set.
 Doc Brown appeared in the Back to the Future comic series published by Harvey Comics, which detailed further adventures of the animated series.
 Lloyd voiced Doc Brown in Back to the Future: The Game, developed by Telltale Games as a sequel to the film series.
 Doc Brown appeared in the Back to the Future comic series published by IDW Publishing, which detailed Doc's and Marty's adventures before and after the events depicted in the films.
 In February 2020, a stage musical adaptation of the first film premiered at the Manchester Opera House in the UK, starring Roger Bart in the role of Doc Brown. The production was forced to close early due to the shutting down of performance venues at the onset of the COVID-19 pandemic, but was revived for a West End run at the Adelphi Theatre from August 2021, with Bart reprising the Doc Brown role. The show will transfer to Broadway in June 2023, with Bart once again reprising his role as Doc Brown.

Name 
The character's family name is similar to German rocket engineer Wernher von Braun until his family changed it to Brown during WW1. Emmett or Emit spelled slightly differently is the backward spelling of time. His second name, Lathrop, roughly spells portal backwards.

Other appearances 
 Lloyd appeared as Doc Brown in the 1990 Warner Bros. program The Earth Day Special.
 Lloyd voices an animated Doc Brown as a cameo in The Simpsons Ride, in a reference to the closure of the Back to the Future ride.
 Lloyd voices Doc Brown in the Robot Chicken episodes "Casablankman 2" and "Eaten by Cats".
 Doc Brown appeared in the Universal Studios show, Bill and Ted's Excellent Halloween Adventure giving Bill and Ted a ride back to the future due to Ted misplacing their own time machine.
 Lloyd voices an animated egg Doc Brown in a 2011 episode of Element Animation's The Crack!, "The Epic Adventure", mistaking an egg named Jason for Marty and bringing him back in time, where they meet a younger Jason.
 Lloyd made a cameo appearance as Doc Brown in the 2014 film A Million Ways to Die in the West, where the protagonist sees him covertly working on the DeLorean in a barn.
 Lloyd voiced Doc Brown in the 2015 video game Lego Dimensions, as well as playing the character in a live-action advertisement for the game.
 Doc Brown and Marty appeared on Jimmy Kimmel Live! on the October 21, 2015 show, set on the day that the characters traveled to in Part II.
 Lloyd played himself portraying Doc Brown in the 2016 Funny or Die satire film Donald Trump's The Art of the Deal: The Movie.
 A Lego minifigure of Emmett Brown appears in The Lego Movie 2: The Second Part when Rex Dangervest conjures up various Time Machine parts to create his own, including the DeLorean.
 Christopher appeared as Doc Brown in the Discovery original, Expedition Unknown show, Expedition: Back to the Future released on March 15, 2021.

Influence 
Rick Sanchez of the American animated series Rick and Morty (voiced by Justin Roiland) began as a parody of Doc Brown; in September 2021, Christopher Lloyd portrayed Sanchez himself in a series of promotional interstitials for the series' two-part fifth season finale, alongside Jaeden Martell as Morty Smith (also voiced by Roiland in the series), a character inspired by Marty McFly. Addressing Roiland's and his own portrayals of Rick compared to Doc Brown, Christopher Lloyd stated "that he felt like Doc and Rick were like two brothers that took different paths".

References

External links 
 Emmett Brown on IMDb

Back to the Future (franchise)
Fictional California Institute of Technology people
Fictional characters from California
Fictional engineers
Fictional German American people
Fictional inventors
Fictional scientists in films
Fictional smiths
Fictional mad scientists
Fictional physicists
Film characters introduced in 1985
Science fiction film characters
Time travelers